Outcrop is an unincorporated community in Fayette County, Pennsylvania, United States.

History
A post office called Outcrop was established in 1900, and remained in operation until 1934. The origin of the name "Outcrop" is obscure.

References

Unincorporated communities in Fayette County, Pennsylvania
Unincorporated communities in Pennsylvania